"Funky Love" is a song by Belgian singer and actress Laura Tesoro. It was released as a digital download in Belgium on 25 February 2015 through Tomusic Records. The song has charted in Belgium, and was written by Tom Lodewyckx, Steven Vergauwen and Tesoro.

Track listing

Charts

Release history

References

2015 singles
2015 songs
Laura Tesoro songs